Cyrtandra may refer to:
Cyrtandra (plant), a genus of plants in the family Gesneriaceae
Cyrtandra (moth), a genus of moths in the family Noctuidae. It is now known as Avittonia